Silloth (sometimes known as Silloth-on-Solway) is a port town and civil parish in the Allerdale borough of Cumbria, England. Historically in the county of Cumberland, the town is an example of a Victorian seaside resort in the North of England.

Silloth had a population of 2,932 at the 2001 Census, falling slightly to 2,906 at the 2011 Census.

Location

History
Silloth developed in the 1860s onwards around the terminus of the railway from Carlisle and associated docks which had begun construction in 1855 to replace Port Carlisle as the deep-water port for Carlisle.

Workers from the factories of Carlisle were presented with access to the seaside, and the town flourished as a destination for day trippers. The town reached the peak of its popularity in the late 19th and early 20th centuries.

Etymology
'Silloth' means  "'sea barn(s)', v. 'sǣ hlaða'." (The first word is Old English, the second is Old Norse).

Governance
Silloth is part of the Workington constituency of the UK parliament. The current Member of Parliament as of 2019 is Mark Jenkinson, a Conservative, who unseated former MP Sue Hayman at the 2019 General Election.

For Local Government purposes it is in the Silloth + Solway Coast Ward of Allerdale Borough Council (this ward stretches north and inland with a total population at the 2011 Census of 3,268.) and the  Solway Coast Division of Cumbria County Council.

Silloth has its own Parish Council; Silloth-on-Solway Town Council.

Churches

Silloth's largest church is Christ Church, situated in a complete rectangular plot which was planned into the original town design. It is on a commanding site at Criffel Street and the body of the church was completed in 1870. The porch tower and large broach spire were completed later in 1878, and house a ring of 8 bells which are chimed. It was designed by Carlisle architect Charles John Ferguson in the Gothic style, and is built with an interesting mix of local sandstone, and granite which was brought by the North British Railway from Newry in Northern Ireland. Much of the interior is faced with yellow brick trimmed with red.

There are several churches and chapels of other denominations in the town.

Industry

Port of Silloth

One of the busiest ports in Cumbria, Silloth is owned and operated by Associated British Ports. The main cargoes are wheat, fertiliser, molasses, forest products and general cargo.

Carr's Flour Mill

An example of a Victorian flour mill, the building was constructed adjacent to the New Dock in 1887. Carr's flour mill is an operating mill which supplies flour to a number of food manufacturers such as United Biscuits, Warburtons and several other leading bakeries and confectioners. Carr's Flour Mill is now owned by Whitworths.

Cheri Foam 
In the 1960's there re-located to Silloth airfield two businesses that had outgrown their factory in Whitehaven. They were Cumberland Curled hair and Cheri Foam. They were the largest employers in the area until the late 1970s.
Cheri Foam- the larger of the two enterprises was owned by Mr Kurt Oppenheim, who had established his business originally in Whitehaven in 1946. He bought two of the hangers on the airfield and later joined the hangers together to create large factory space and storage units for the manufacture of polyurethane foam blocks. This was an industrial chemical process and a foam block conversion unit . 'Conversion' means that the blocks were cut up into shapes like cushions and sheets to be supplied to the furniture, bedding and motor industries. In 1973 an additional factory unit was added to house the production of foam moulded car parts by high pressure injection foam machines. Machinery equipment in the factory was largely manufactured by a team of Silloth metal fitters and local electricians employed full time by the factory. There was a laboratory and a fibreglass mould making unit on site as well as a garaging unit to service the fourteen container vans that the company used to ship its production all over the UK. It was a twenty four hours a day operation with production leaving the works at all hours. The logo  Cheri Foam on the sides of vans was very familiar in the area. About a hundred and fifty people worked in this factory, some from Silloth and many bussed in from Maryport and surrounds each day. The business was acquired by the Beaver Group in 1976 and Mr Oppenheim retired to join his family in London. Its main customer Times Furnishing eventually closed and after this the business ran down and eventually closed.
Mr Oppenheim establish a group called 'West Cumberland Industrialist' to encourage interchange of experience and friendship between the executives of West Cumbrian businesses. This ran on for many years after his departure.

Agriculture

Farming of livestock, mainly sheep, beef and dairy cattle, takes up most of the surrounding landscape.

Tourism

There are a number of static and touring caravan and camping parks in the town and surrounding area.

Derwent Brewery

The town has a small brewery which produces traditional ales to the original recipes for the guest beer market.

Many small businesses are located on the former Second World War airfield and associated buildings.

Notable people

James Wasdale Brough

Born in Silloth in 1903, Jim Brough played rugby union for Silloth and England. He played in the Cumberland side that won the county championship in 1924 and made his international debut against New Zealand in January 1925. He switched codes and played rugby league for Leeds and Great Britain, captaining the national side in 1936. As a coach, he took Workington Town to two finals in 1955 and 1958 before coaching the Great Britain touring team, which became the most successful touring side and the only touring team to score over 1,000 points. In 2005, Silloth RUFC renamed their ground in his honour.

Charlotte Cecilia Pitcairn Leitch

Cecil Leitch was born in Silloth in 1891. A self-taught golfer, she won four British Ladies amateurs between 1914 and 1926. In total she won 12 national titles, 5 French Amateur Ladies and one Canadian Women's Amateur before retiring in 1927. During her playing career, she was one of the leading ladies in the sport and transformed the way that the game was played by women.

Kathleen Ferrier

Kathleen Ferrier, a contralto singer, shot to fame while living in Silloth and performing in Cumberland. She died in 1953 at the age of 41 and Granta magazine wrote at the time that she "may well have been the most celebrated woman in Britain after the Queen". There is now a café known as 'Mrs Willson's' named in honour of this talented woman. This café is located on Criffel Street, overlooking the green.

Tourism

Tourism is a major contributor to the economy in Silloth, with dozens of large and small static and touring caravan parks located within a  radius of the town centre, resulting in a large increase in the population during the summer months.

Silloth hosts several small annual events held on the town green. These include a beer festival held in September, its steam rally, kite and food festivals.

Amenities include a championship golf course, several hotels and bed and breakfasts, public houses, tea rooms and eateries. There is a local 'free' newspaper published monthly entitled 'The Solway Buzz' - distributed to households in the area by a team of volunteers - which covers news and events in Silloth and the surrounding area.

Airfield

The airfield opened in June 1939, just before the start of the Second World War, and closed on 31 December 1960. Originally designed to be used by RAF Maintenance Command, 22MU, the airfield was handed over to Coastal Command during November 1939. No 1 Operational Training Unit (OTU) was then responsible for training pilots and crews from the UK and Allied Countries. Therefore, the aerodrome had twin responsibilities, the maintenance and repair of planes for use in the war effort and the training of crews from allied countries to fly planes.

Transport

Railway

The railway to Silloth opened in 1856. The line passed through the villages of Kirkbride and Abbeytown to Carlisle. The railway carried both passengers and freight from the port. and tourists visiting the town. It was closed as part of the Beeching cuts in 1964.

Road
Silloth is on the B5302 road, which leads to the A596 and the town of Wigton, and the B5300 which connects the town to Maryport.

See also

Listed buildings in Silloth-on-Solway
Solway Community School

References

Sources

External links

  Cumbria County History Trust: Silloth (nb: provisional research only - see Talk page)
Official page
Silloth at Visitcumbria
History of Silloth

 
Towns in Cumbria
Seaside resorts in England
Ports and harbours of Cumbria
Populated coastal places in Cumbria
Civil parishes in Cumbria
Allerdale